Beer has been produced in Armenia since ancient times. In the 5th century BCE, after arriving at a village in Ancient Armenia, Xenophon wrote in the Anabasis that "There were stored wheat, barley, vegetables, and barley wine in the craters (clay pots). In upper level of  vessels with the edges  in the wine floated barley, and there was stuck a reed, large and small sizes and who wanted to drink, had to take a reed in his mouth and pull it through the wine.  Not mixed with water, the wine was very strong, but for local people it was a very pleasant drink".

Beer festival

The Yerevan Beer Fest is held annually during August. It was first organized in 2014. The Swan lake located in the park near the Yerevan Opera Theatre is the regular home of the festival. More than 10,000 visitors attended the 5th edition of the Yerevan Beer Fest in August 2018, which featured all the breweries and microbreweries in Armenia.

Breweries

The first brewery in modern history of Armenia was opened in  1892 in Yerevan. Known as Zanga Brewery, the plant was located in the Hrazdan River gorge. The brewery's products were branded as Bok-Beer. However, the plant was closed during the 1920s.

As of November 2020, the following six brewing companies are operating in Armenia:
Beer of Yerevan Brewery: operating since 1952 in Yerevan, and currently producing beer under the brands Kilikia (flagship brand), Yerevan, Hayer, Městské Pivo and 12.06.
Gyumri Beer Brewery: operating since 1970 in Gyumri, Shirak Province, and currently producing beer under the brands Gyumri (flagship brand), Ararat and Aleksandrapol.
Kotayk Brewery: operating since 1974 in Abovyan, Kotayk Province, and currently producing beer under the brands Kotayk (flagship brand), Erebuni and Urartu.
Lihnitis Sevan Brewery: operating since 2007 in Sevan, Gegharkunik Province, and currently producing beer under the brand Kellers.
Hayasy Group: operating since 2007 in Voskevaz village, Aragatsotn Province, and currently producing beer under the brand Hayasy.
Dilijan Brewery: operating since 2016 in Dilijan, Tavush Province, and currently producing beer under the brand Dilijan.

Microbreweries/Brewpubs
As of 2019, there are eight microbreweries/brewpubs that produce and serve draught/unfiltered beer in Armenia:
Alaverdi Draft Beer: operating since 1947 in Alaverdi, Lori Province, and currently serving Alaverdi unfiltered beer.
AM Group: operating since 1998 in Tairov village, Armavir Province, and currently serving Jäger unfiltered beer and Roskvas kvass.
Art Beer 1680: operating since 2017 in Kakavadzor village of Aragatsotn Province, and currently serving Art beer (light and dark).
Blonder Beer House and Brewery: operating since 2000 in Yerevan, and currently serving Blonder Slovak pilsner unfiltered beer.
Beer Academy Yerevan: operating since 2012 in Yerevan, and currently serving Academia unfiltered beer.
Dargett Craft Beer: operating since 2016 in Yerevan, and currently serving Dargett craft beer.
Tovmas Craft Beer: operating since 2016 in Yerevan, and currently serving Tovmas unfiltered beer.
Vladimir Hakobyan Microbrewery: operating since 2017 in Dovegh village, Tavush Province, and currently serving Dovegh's unfiltered beer.

Republic of Artsakh

The Republic of Artsakh currently has a single brewery – Central Brewpub in the capital Stepanakert.

See also
List of breweries in Armenia
Armenian wine
Beer and breweries by region

References